Jonathon Orlando (born August 24, 1987) is an American soccer player.

Career
Orlando signed a contract with Carolina RailHawks on April 1, 2016. Orlando scored his first professional goal on June 1 during a U.S. Open Cup match against the Charlotte Independence.

References

1987 births
Living people
American soccer players
UDC Firebirds men's soccer players
RVA FC players
North Carolina FC players
Association football midfielders
Soccer players from Washington, D.C.
North American Soccer League players
Major Arena Soccer League players
Baltimore Blast players
National Premier Soccer League players